Tan Sri Dato' Sri (Dr.) Leo Moggie anak Irok  (born 1 October 1941) is a Malaysian former politician and former President of Sarawak Native People's Party (PBDS); a splinter party of the Sarawak National Party (SNAP) following the 1983 leadership crisis. He is a former chairman of Tenaga Nasional Berhad (TNB) from 2004 to 2020.

Early life
He was born in 1941 in Kanowit, Sarawak. Obtained early education at Tanjung Lobang Primary School, Miri and St Joseph School, Kuching before continuing his studies at Batu Lintang Teachers Training College, Miri.

He then obtained a master's degree in history from Otago University in 1965 and a Master in Business Administration from the University of Pennsylvania.

Career
He started his career in private sector as the deputy general manager of Borneo Development Corporation from 1973 to 1974. He held various civil servant positions in Sarawak from 1966 to 1974.

Politics

He began his political career as the Member of Parliament (MP) for Kanowit from 1974 to 2004. Prior to that, he was the Member of the Sarawak State Legislative Assembly for Machan from 1974 to 1978.

He was served as Minister of Welfare Services in 1976 to 1977 and as Minister of Local Government from 1977 to 1978 in Sarawak Government.

He then, join the Federal Cabinet as Minister of Energy, Telecommunications and Posts from 1978 to 1989. He also then from 1989 to 1995, appointed as the Minister of Works. Then, he was the Minister of Energy, Telecommunications and Posts again from 1995 to 1998. His last position as minister was as the Minister of Energy, Communications and Multimedia from 1998 to 2004.

Upon retirement
He is a former chairman of the board for Tenaga Nasional Berhad (TNB) from 12 April 2004 to 11 March 2020, making him the longest-serving chairman of the company. He also served as the chairman of the boards for Universiti Tenaga Nasional (UNITEN) and its pro-chancellor. He also serves as a director of Kapar Energy Ventures Sdn Bhd from 2004.

He is the adjunct professor at the Faculty of Communications and Modern Languages, Universiti Utara Malaysia since March 2005.

He is also serves as senior independent non-executive director at DiGi Telecommunications Sdn Bhd and has been its independent non-executive director since 2005. At Asian Plantations Limited he was the independent non-executive director until 2014. He is the senior independent non-executive director of Digi.com Bhd until 2013. At New Straits Times Press, he served as non-executive director until 2008.

Honours
He received an honorary doctorate of laws from Otago University, New Zealand, in 2000 and honorary doctorate of science from Multimedia University, Malaysia, in 2003.

Honours of Malaysia
  :
  Commander of the Order of Loyalty to the Crown of Malaysia (PSM) – Tan Sri (2005)
  :
  Knight Commander of the Most Exalted Order of the Star of Sarawak (PNBS) – formerly Dato', now Dato Sri (1980)
  Knight Commander of the Order of the Star of Hornbill Sarawak (DA) – Datuk Amar (1999)
  :
  Grand Knight of the Order of Sultan Ahmad Shah of Pahang (SSAP) – Dato' Sri (2007)

See also
 Kanowit (federal constituency)
 Machan (state constituency)

References

1941 births
Living people
People from Sarawak
Dayak people
Iban people
Malaysian businesspeople
Sarawak politicians
Leaders of political parties in Malaysia
Parti Bansa Dayak Sarawak politicians
Malaysian Roman Catholics
Sarawak National Party politicians
Government ministers of Malaysia
Members of the Dewan Rakyat
Sarawak state ministers
Members of the Sarawak State Legislative Assembly
University of Otago alumni
Smeal College of Business alumni
Commanders of the Order of Loyalty to the Crown of Malaysia
Knights Commander of the Most Exalted Order of the Star of Sarawak
Knights Commander of the Order of the Star of Hornbill Sarawak
21st-century Malaysian politicians